Cliff Lewis may refer to:

 Cliff Lewis (quarterback) (1923–2002), American football player for the Cleveland Browns
 Cliff Lewis (linebacker) (born 1959), former linebacker in the National Football League
 Cliff Lewis (Matlock), a fictional character in Matlock